Bussière-Poitevine is a former commune in the Haute-Vienne department in the Nouvelle-Aquitaine region in western France. On 1 January 2019, it was merged into the new commune Val-d'Oire-et-Gartempe.

Geography
The river Gartempe forms all of the commune's eastern border.

See also
Communes of the Haute-Vienne department

References

Former communes of Haute-Vienne